Japan participated in the 2013 Asian Youth Games in Nanjing, China on 16 August – 24 August 2013. The nation sent 62 athletes to the games. Japan finished third at the medal table with seven gold, five silver, and six bronze medals.

Medalists

References 

2013 in Japanese sport
Sport in Japan
Japan at the Asian Games
Nations at the 2013 Asian Youth Games